The International Gender and Language Association (IGALA), is an international interdisciplinary academic organization that promotes research on language, gender, and sexuality. Claire Maree is its current president.

History 
The association was formed in 1999, having developed out of the graduate-student-run Berkeley Women and Language Group. IGALA holds a biannual conference. The society's official affiliated academic journal is Gender and Language, launched in 2007 by Equinox Press. IGALA also publishes volumes of selected proceedings. Together these projects have helped shepherd in the expansion of gender studies into a wider set of topics from a wider range of regions than before, expanding beyond the earlier focus on English speakers that dominated work of earlier decades.

Previous conferences 

IGALA 1 - Stanford University, Stanford, California, May 5–7, 2000
IGALA 2 - Lancaster University, Lancaster, England, United Kingdom, April 12–14, 2002
IGALA 3 - Cornell University, Ithaca, New York, United States, June 5–7, 2004
IGALA 4 - University of Valencia, Valencia, Spain, November 8–10, 2006
IGALA 5 - Victoria University of Wellington, Wellington, New Zealand, July 3–5, 2008
IGALA 6 - Tsuda College, Tokyo, Japan, September 18–20, 2010
IGALA 7 - Universidade do Vale do Rio dos Sinos, São Leopoldo, Brazil, June 20–22, 2012
IGALA 8 - Simon Fraser University, Vancouver, Canada, June 5–7, 2014
IGALA 9 - City University of Hong Kong, May 19–21, 2016
IGALA 10 - University of Botswana, 20–22 June 2018
IGALA 11 - Queen Mary University of London, 22–24 June 2021

Prominent Members 
The International Gender and Language Association is made up of several members who believe in their cause and support the organization. There are many different roles and levels of participation in this organization as well.

The President

The current President of IGALA is Claire Maree. The post itself is elected, and runs for two years. She is responsible for representing IGALA, working for balancing policies that take into consideration multiple genders, sexuality, and those language aspects. She also works to establish positive working relationships with other academic organizations, and strives to make sure everyone in the organization has a voice. In addition to balancing these responsibilities, she creates the agenda for meetings, chairs the executive meetings, monitoring the IGALA site, and maintaining positive relationships with the journal editors.

The Secretary

The current Secretary of IGALA is Kristine Kohler Mortensen, who is a postdoctoral fellow at the University of Gothenburg in the Department of Swedish Language. The role of the secretary is to maintain meeting records, calling and running elections, posting minutes of public meetings and results of elections, and maintaining membership lists and records.

The Social Media/Communications Officer

The current Communications Officer of IGALA is Lucy Jones, an Associate Professor in Sociolinguistics based at the University of Nottingham in the U.K. The role of the communications officer is maintaining mailing lists, maintaining the IGALA website, updating and maintaining the IGALA social media, advising on appropriate social media strategies, reporting on communications, and ensuring the consistency in the voice of IGALA.

The Graduate Student Representative

The current Graduate Student Representative of IGALA is Rachel Elizabeth Weissler. She is responsible for bringing issues of concern to graduate students to the IGALA board, working with board members to make sure graduate students have an active presence in the organization, developing graduate student workshops, and organizing the IGALA Graduate Student Essay Competition.

Ordinary Members

Some current ordinary members are Linda McLoughlin, Benedict Rowlett, and Denise Troutman. While these members are on the advisory council, they serve as a voice for the ordinary members. The role of the ordinary members is to organize IGALA Conferences, liaising with journal editors, maintaining and developing the IGALA website, moderating and running the GALA-list, promoting visibility on matters of gender, sexuality,  and language, making National Science Foundation grant applications for conferences, organizing an IGALA book prize or Best Article Prize, and much more.

Journal 
At the centre of its publications, IGALA runs its own journal under the title Gender and Language, which publishes both articles and reviews. It has sizeable archive of published works since 2007 in a total of thirteen annual volumes. With Rodrigo Borba of Universidade Federal do Rio de Janeiro, Kira Hall, of University of Colorado Boulder, and Mie Hiramoto of National University of Singapore as its editors, Federica Formato of University of Brighton as the book review editor and 46 members on its editorial and advisory boards, Gender and Language publishes an average of more than 23 articles every year. Overall, Gender and Language has published 26 editorials, 190 articles, 78 reviews, 1 research note and 1 response adding up to a total of 296 publications. The subjects focused on include but are not limited to 'feminism', 'masculinism', 'relationships', 'language of media', 'homosexuality, and 'ethnicity'.

Most viewed articles

"What are you doing here, I thought you had a kid now?' The stigmatization of working mothers in academia – a critical self-reflective essay on gender, motherhood and the neoliberal academy" This article by Janet Holmes discusses the gender prejudices that exist with mothers working in academia. The author talks about personal and political implications on this topic.
"Exceptionalizing intersectionality: a corpus study of implied readership in guidance for survivors of domestic abuse" In this article, Abigaël Candelas de la Ossa talks about domestic abuse applying feminist discourse analysis and corpus methods. With this, de la Ossa analyzes a text by a British organization that supports women who have survived domestic violence.
"Can the term "genderlect" be saved? A postmodernist re-definition" Heiko Motschenbacher talks about the definition of the term "genderlect" from a postmodernist perspective. The author approaches the subject making use of gender linguistic stylization in advertising discourse.
"Do bodies matter? Travestis' embodiment of (trans)gender identity through the manipulation of the Brazilian Portuguese grammatical gender system" In this article, Rodrigo Borba and Cristina Ostermann talk about how travestis in southern Brazil use grammatical gender in the Portuguese language to manage their own identity and the identity of their community.
"Social constructionism, postmodernism and feminist sociolinguistics" Janet Holmes uses an ethnographic approach to describe gendered social interaction. Holmes talks about the community of practice approach to addressing discursive behaviors that penalize women in the workplace.

Bylaws 
IGALA upholds specific by-laws with a total of sixteen articles with detailed regulations under each. They include the name of the association, its powers, membership rules, due payments, officers, executive committee, advisory council, conferences and meetings, quorum, nominations and elections, balloting referendums, finances, and amendments. The entire set of regulations addressed by each article has been clearly outlined in a downloadable file which can accessed via this link.

References

External links
 IGALA home page
 Facebook page
 Twitter: @IGALAssoc

Gender studies organizations
Linguistic societies